Aecidium cantense is a species of fungus in the Pucciniales order. It is a plant pathogen known from Peru. It grows and shows symptoms of yellowish-orangish pustules during mid-to-late stages of growth on potatoes (Solanum tuberosum).

References 

Fungal plant pathogens and diseases
Potato diseases
Pucciniales
Fungi described in 1929
Fungi of Peru